Kaleh Jub or Kalleh Jub or Koleh Jub or Kolahjub or Kolehjub or Kolah Jub or Kalah Jub may refer to:

Ilam Province
Kolahjub, Ilam
Kaleh Jub, Eyvan, Ilam Province
Kolahjub, Shirvan and Chardaval, Ilam Province

Kermanshah Province
Koleh Jub, Eslamabad-e Gharb, a village in Eslamabd-e Gharb County
Kolah Jub-e Esfandiari, a village in Gilan-e Gharb County
Kolah Jub-e Karmi, a village in Gilan-e Gharb County
Kolah Jub-e Olya-ye Do, a village in Gilan-e Gharb County
Kolah Jub-e Olya-ye Yek, a village in Gilan-e Gharb County
Kolah Jub-e Sofla, Kermanshah, a village in Gilan-e Gharb County
Kalleh Jub, Kermanshah, a village in Kermanshah County
Kalleh Jub, Qasr-e Shirin, a village in Qasr-e Shirin County
Kolehjub-e Dartang, a village in Sahneh County
Kolah Jub-e Olya, Kermanshah, a village in Sahneh County

Lorestan Province
Kaleh Jub, Delfan, a village in Delfan County
Kalleh Jub-e Hajj Ali, a village in Khorramabad County
Kalleh Jub, Zagheh, a village in Khorramabad County
Koleh Jub-e Sofla, Lorestan, a village in Khorramabad County

Markazi Province
Koleh Jub, Markazi